Kushk or Koshk is a town in Afghanistan that shares its name with the Kushk River which flows by the town. It is the center of Kushk District, Herat Province. The population is 17,479.

References

See also
Herat Province

Populated places in Herat Province